The JAC Shuailing T8 (帅铃T8) is a mid-sized pickup truck produced by JAC Motors for the Chinese market.

Overview

The JAC Shuailing T8 pickup was launched in the Chinese market in 2018, with prices ranging from 88,800 yuan to 162,800 yuan as of 2020.

A total of three engine options are available for the 2020 JAC T8 in the Chinese Market, including the 2.0 liter CTI turbo inline-4 diesel putting out 138 PS at 3600 rpm along with 320 Nm of torque at 1600 - 2600 rpm, a 2.0 liter turbo inline-4 gasoline engine which produces 190 PS at 5000 rpm and 290 Nm of torque at 1800 - 4800 rpm, and a 2.4 liter turbo inline-4 gasoline engine. All models only come with a six-speed manual transmission. It’s also available in both 4x2 and 4x4 configurations.

Being based on the same platform as the T6, the Shuailing T8 has a pickup bed with similar dimensions of 1520×1520×470mm and a LWB version in a size of 1810×1520×470mm offering higher load capacity.

Electric version
There is an all-electric version of the T8, known as the i3-T330, equipped with a 67.2-kWh battery. The name i3-T330 is used for two different electric pickup trucks, one based on the T8 and one based on the older T6.

References

External links
Official JAC Shuailing T8 website 

T8
Trucks of China
Pickup trucks
All-wheel-drive vehicles
Rear-wheel-drive vehicles
2010s cars